John Delacourt Russell (b Hendon 1868 – d Riverton 9 February 1949) was the Archdeacon of Oamaru from 1915 until 1928 when it was renamed the Archdeaconry of North Otago, serving a further 16 years until his retirement in 1944: a total of 29 years. until his death on 9 February 1949.

Russell was ordained in 1893. He was Curate of St. Stephen the Martyr, Ōpōtiki. Later he held incumbencies at Bulls, Petone and Oamaru.

References

People from Hendon
Archdeacons of North Otago
1868 births
1949 deaths